Eyobiasang is an Oron Village in Urue-Offong/Oruko local government area of Akwa Ibom state in Nigeria. Formed by the children of Abia Essang from the Ubodung clan of the Oron Nation.1

References 

Places in Oron Nation
Villages in Akwa Ibom